The Jing-Mei White Terror Memorial Park is a museum in Xindian District, New Taipei City, Taiwan.

History
The building used to serve as a military school from 1957 to 1967. It later housed military courts and a detention center called the Jingmei Military Detention Center for political dissidents during the White Terror period. Former prisoners in the detention center include Annette Lu, Chen Chu and Shih Ming-teh. In 1991, the center was closed.

In 2007, the center was turned into a human rights memorial and museum featuring Taiwan's democracy movement at the suggestion of Vice President Annette Lu. In early April 2009, the Council for Cultural Affairs changed the name of the site to Jing-Mei Human Rights Memorial and Cultural Park.

In 2018, the ownership has moved to the National Human Rights Museum established in the same year, who changed the name of the site to its current name Jing-Mei White Terror Memorial Park.

Transportation
The museum is accessible within walking distance north west from Dapinglin Station of Taipei Metro.

See also
 List of museums in Taiwan
 Green Island White Terror Memorial Park

References

External links

 
 Tsai touts achievements in human rights, justice Taipei Times
 KMT's Chiang visits human rights park Taipei Times 
 EDITORIAL: KMT's whitewashing not forgotten Taipei Times

2007 establishments in Taiwan
Museums in New Taipei
White Terror (Taiwan)
Memorial parks in Taiwan